Robert Harlow may refer to:

Bob Harlow, an American golfer
Robert Harlow, a Canadian writer